This is the results breakdown of the local elections held in Galicia on 24 May 2015. The following tables show detailed results in the autonomous community's most populous municipalities, sorted alphabetically.

Opinion polls

Overall

City control
The following table lists party control in the most populous municipalities, including provincial capitals (shown in bold). Gains for a party are displayed with the cell's background shaded in that party's colour.

Municipalities

A Coruña
Population: 244,810

Ames
Population: 29,975

Arteixo
Population: 30,857

Cambre
Population: 24,029

Carballo
Population: 31,288

Culleredo
Population: 29,434

Ferrol
Population: 70,389

Lalín
Population: 20,158

Lugo
Population: 98,560

Narón
Population: 39,574

Oleiros
Population: 34,563

Ourense
Population: 106,905

Pontevedra
Population: 82,946

Redondela
Population: 29,909

Ribeira
Population: 27,565

Santiago de Compostela
Population: 95,800

Vigo
Population: 294,997

Vilagarcía de Arousa
Population: 37,712

References

Galicia
2015